

See also

International comparisons of labor unions
Labor unions in the United States
Right-to-work law

References

External links
 
 
 State Union Membership Density, 1964–2008 (Excel file)
 State Union Coverage Density, 1977–2008 (Excel file)

Labor relations in the United States
States of the United States-related lists